My First Affair was a cabaret show and the soundtrack later released by American Broadway-country-gospel artist Lari White.

Show
The cabaret show was at the Oak Room cabaret at the Algonquin Hotel in Manhattan, New York City, on February 12, 2007. The show included a mix of pop, country, gospel and Broadway songs including several original compositions by White.   The album was released on April 6, 2007 on Skinny White Girl Records.

Track listing

“Please Be Kind/ Gotta Have Me Go With You” (Sammy Kahn, Saul Chapman/ Harold Arlen, Ira Gershwin) - 2:30
“There’s A Terrific Band” (Alan Bergman, Marilyn Bergman, Billy Goldenberg) - 3:32
“Doatsy Mae” (Carol Hall) - 3:12
“Minor Changes” (Lari White) - 2:14
“Museums” (Steven Lutvak) - 4:33
“Forgiveness’ Embrace” (Stephen Schwartz) - 4:00
“Love Me or Leave Me” (Walter Donaldson, Gus Kahn) - 2:15
Richard Rogers Medley: “Falling in Love With Love” (Richard Rodgers, Lorenz Hart) / “A Cockeyed Optimist” (Oscar Hammerstein II, Richard Rodgers) - 2:49
“Over and Over” (Lari White) - 3:46
“It Ain’t My Business” (DeSpain, Anderson-Lopez) - 3:26
Yentl Medley: “Where is it Written?” (Alan Bergman, Marilyn Bergman, Michel Legrand) / “No Wonder” (Alan Bergman, Marilyn Bergman, Michel Legrand)/ “A Piece of Sky” (Alan Bergman, Marilyn Bergman, Michel Legrand) - 6:42
“It’s A New World” (Ira Gershwin, Harold Arlen) - 2:04

Production
Producer: Lari White
Recorded Live by: Chris Herles and Jean Pierre Perreaux At the Metropolitan Room at Gotham, courtesy Chris Mazzilli
Directed by: Eric Michael Gillett
Piano: Don Rebic
Bass: Steve Doyle

References 

Lari White albums
Cabaret albums
2007 albums
Albums produced by Lari White